Shawn Adams (born April 4, 1974 in Bridgewater, Nova Scotia) is a Canadian curler from Upper Tantallon, Nova Scotia.

Career
Adams rose to curling prominence being runner-up at the 1992 Canadian Junior Curling Championships, and then the next year, won the 1993 Canadian Junior Curling Championships, however he was stripped of the championship because of alcohol violations after the victory.

7 years later Adams came back to the scene winning the Nova Scotia championships for the right to go to the 2000 Labatt Brier, where he finished 3-8. Two years later, at the 2002 Nokia Brier he improved on that record with a 6-5 record. Finally, at the 2005 Tim Hortons Brier, Adams would finish the round-robin with an 8-3 record earning him a berth in the playoffs. In the playoffs, Adams defeated Quebec's Jean-Michel Menard in the 3-4 game, then he defeated Manitoba's Randy Dutiaume in the semi-final before losing to Randy Ferbey and Alberta in the final. Adams won his final Nova Scotia championship in 2011, and went 5-6 at the 2011 Tim Hortons Brier.

In 2011, Adams moved to Newfoundland and Labrador. In 2013, he played in his only provincial championship in the province. He would later move back to Nova Scotia.

Grand Slam record

References

External links
 

1974 births
Curlers from Newfoundland and Labrador
Curlers from Nova Scotia
Canadian male curlers
Living people
People from Bridgewater, Nova Scotia
Canadian people of British descent
Canada Cup (curling) participants
21st-century Canadian people